Ahmed el-Madini (Arabic:أحمد المديني) is a scholar, a novelist, a poet, and a translator from Morocco.

Early life
He was born near Casablanca in 1947. Al-Madini studied in Paris and was awarded a doctoral degree from the Sorbonne.

Career
He has published eight short story collections, eight novels, two poetry collections, and five volumes of cultural essays.  He also published translations and scholarly studies about the short story, the novel, and narrative in general. In 2003 he was awarded the National Book Award in Morocco.

Notes

Bibliography
Benmarek Mariam, An annotated translation of five short stories of the Moroccan writer Ahmad Al madini, 2005

Novels:
Al’unfu fid Dimagh (العنف في الدماغ)
 Al-Janaza, (الجنازة)
Ihtimalat Al-Balad Al-Azraq (احتمالات البلد الأزرق)
Ro’ya Seen (رؤية سين)
Poetry Collections:
 Bardul Masafat (برد المسافات)
Andalus Al-Raghba (أندلس الرغبة)
Baqaya Gheyab (بقايا غياب)

External links
 Banipal, Magazine of Modern Arab Literature  (retrieved on 06-01-2008)

Moroccan novelists
Moroccan male writers
Male novelists
20th-century Moroccan poets
University of Paris alumni
1947 births
Living people
People from Casablanca
21st-century Moroccan poets